Capu Câmpului is a commune located in Suceava County, Bukovina, northeastern Romania. It is composed of a single village, more specifically Capu Câmpului, part of Valea Moldovei commune from 1968 to 2003, when it was split off.

Administration and local politics

Communal council 

The commune's current local council has the following political composition, according to the results of the 2020 Romanian local elections:

References 

Communes in Suceava County
Localities in Southern Bukovina